Boccia at the 1988 Summer Paralympics consisted of three events.

Medal summary

References 

 

1988 Summer Paralympics events
1988
Paralympics